Nana Kofi Asihene (born 13 June 1980; professionally known as Nana Asihene) is a Ghanaian music video director, creative consultant, film producer and film maker.

He has worked with several musical genres and artists including Sarkodie, Stonebwoy, Kwabena Kwabena, R2Bees, Mr Eazi, Ayigbe Edem, Ice Prince, Pappy Kojo, and many others.

Early life
Asihene was born in Accra, where he attended Glory Primary and JHS and Accra Academy where he studied Visual Arts. He further had his Diploma in Fine Art from the Ultimate School of Art. He studied Textile Design at the Kwame Nkrumah University of Science and Technology and got an MBA from the Accra Business School.

Career
Asihene went into music and film production in 2009. He has worked for brands like Vodafone Ghana on the Life on Vodafone 4G project. He is also a fashion designer. He is currently the Creative Director and Lead Consultant of NKACC which is a brands and communication company. He also established the Nana Asihene Design Studio.

Personal life 
Asihene is related to Theodosia Okoh and T-Michael. He is married to Sophia Asihene and they have a boy.

Selected videography
Mr Eazi ft Efya - Skintight
Ice Prince ft Sarkodie - Shots on Shots
Sarkodie ft Castro  - Adonai Remix
Ayigbe Edem ft Kaakie - Latex 
Ayigbe Edem ft Raquel - Girlfriend
EL ft Shaker – See Me Suffer
Stonebwoy ft Patoranking – Pull Up Remix
Yaa Yaa – Kae
Kwabena Kwabena ft Samini – Adult Music
Lord Paper ft Mr Eazi – Call on Me
Tinny – Regular Champion 
R2Bees – Makoma 
Itz Tiffany – Dance (Neke Neke)
Chase Forever – Lonely
Sarkodie ft Obrafour  - Saa Okodie No

Awards

References

External links
 
 
 Official Website
Conversation with Nana Kofi Asihene on YouTube

Ghanaian music video directors
Living people
1980 births
Ghanaian film directors
Kwame Nkrumah University of Science and Technology alumni
Ghanaian film producers
Ghanaian filmmakers